This is a list of Christian churches in the ceremonial county of Cheshire, England.

Church of England 

The Anglican churches in the county are either part of the diocese of Chester or the diocese of Liverpool.  Since the mid nineteenth century, Chester diocese has been divided into two archdeaconries, the Chester Archdeaconry and the Macclesfield Archdeaconry.  Each archdeaconry is divided into a number of deaneries, some of which are outside the ceremonial county of Cheshire.  All the Cheshire churches in the diocese of Liverpool are in Warrington Archdeaconry. When the diocese was originally created in 1541, it was much larger with twenty deaneries and no archdeaconries. (See History of the Diocese of Chester.)

Diocese of Chester

Chester Archdeaconry

Chester Deanery

St John the Evangelist's Church, Ashton Hayes
St Bartholomew's Church, Barrow
Holy Trinity Without-the-Walls Church, Blacon
Christ Church, Chester
St John the Baptist's Church, Chester
St Paul's Church, Chester
St Peter's Church, Chester
St. Thomas of Canterbury Church, Chester
St James' Church, Christleton
St Mary's Church, Dodleston
St Mary's Church, Eccleston
St John the Baptist's Church, Guilden Sutton
St Mary Without-the-Walls Church, Handbridge
All Saints' Church, Hoole
St Luke's Church, Huntington
St Philip's Church, Kelsall
St Mark's Church, Saltney
St Michael's Church, Plas Newton
St Peter's Church, Plemstall
St Mary's Church, Pulford
St Matthew's Church, Saltney (closed 2000)
St Andrew's Church, Tarvin
The Holy Ascension Church, Upton-by-Chester

Frodsham Deanery

St John the Evangelist's Church, Alvanley
Christ Church, Crowton
St Luke's Church, Dunham on the Hill
St Laurence's Church, Frodsham
St Paul's Church, Helsby
St James' Church, Ince
St John the Evangelist's Church, Kingsley
St John the Evangelist's Church, Manley
St John the Evangelist's Church, Norley
All Saints Church, Runcorn
Holy Trinity Church, Runcorn
St Andrew's Church, Grange, Runcorn
St Berteline and St Christopher's Church, Norton, Runcorn
St John the Evangelist's Church, Weston, Runcorn
St Mark's Church, Hallwood, Runcorn (Ecumenical)
St Mary's Church, Halton, Runcorn
St Michael and All Angels Church, Runcorn
St Mary's Church, Thornton-le-Moors

Great Budworth Deanery

St Mark's Church, Antrobus
St Cross Church, Appleton Thorn
St Peter's Church, Aston-by-Sutton
Christ Church, Barnton
All Saints' Church, Daresbury
St Wilfrid's Church, Grappenhall
St Mary and All Saints Church, Great Budworth
Christ Church, Latchford
St Hilda's Church, Latchford
St James' Church, Latchford
St Michael and All Angels Church, Little Leigh
St Luke's Church, Lower Whitley
St Mary's Church, Lymm
St Thomas' Church, Stockton Heath
St Matthew's Church, Stretton
All Saints Church, Thelwall
St John the Evangelist's Church, Walton, Warrington

Malpas Deanery

St John the Baptist's Church, Aldford
Holy Trinity Church, Bickerton
St Wenefrede's Church, Bickley
St Mary's Church, Bruera
St Boniface's Church, Bunbury
St John's Church, Burwardsley
St Mary's Church, Coddington
St Chad's Church, Farndon
All Saints Church, Handley
St Peter's Church, Hargrave
St Oswald's Church, Malpas
St Michael's Church, Marbury
St Edith's Church, Shocklach
St Helen's Church, Tarporley
St Alban's Church, Tattenhall
St John's Church, Threapwood
St Mary's Church, Tilston
St Jude's Church, Tilstone Fearnall
St Chad's Chapel, Tushingham
St Chad's Church, Tushingham
St Peter's Church, Waverton
St Mary's Church, Whitewell

Middlewich Deanery

St John the Evangelist's Church, Byley
St Wilfrid's Church, Davenham
St Peter's Church, Delamere
St John the Baptist's Church, Hartford
St Peter's Church, Little Budworth
St John the Evangelist's Church, Lostock Gralam
St. Michael and All Angels, Middlewich
St Stephen's Church, Moulton
Holy Trinity Church, Northwich
St Helen Witton Church, Northwich
St Luke's Church, Northwich
St Chad's Church, Over
St John the Evangelist's Church, Sandiway
St Mary's Church, Weaverham
Christ Church, Wharton
St Mary's Church, Whitegate
St John the Evangelist's Church, Winsford

Wirral South Deanery

St Oswald's Church, Backford
St Nicholas' Church, Burton
Holy Trinity Church, Capenhurst
Christ Church, Ellesmere Port (closed 1994)
All Saints Church, Great Saughall
St John the Evangelist's Church, Great Sutton
St Paul's Church, Hooton
St Mary's and St Helen's Church, Neston
St Thomas' Church, Parkgate
St Michael's Church, Shotwick
Christ Church, Willaston

Macclesfield Archdeaconry

Bowdon Deanery

St Peter's Church, Oughtrington
St Elizabeth's Church, Ashley

Chadkirk Deanery

St Mary's Church, Disley

Cheadle Deanery

St Chad's Church, Handforth
St George's Church, Poynton

Congleton Deanery

Christ Church, Alsager
St Mary Magdalene's Church, Alsager
St Mary's Church, Astbury
St Bertoline's Church, Barthomley
St Oswald's Church, Brereton
All Saints Church, Church Lawton
St James' Church, Congleton
St John the Evangelist's Church, Congleton
St Peter's Church, Congleton
St Stephen's Church, Congleton
Christ Church, Eaton
St Peter's Church, Elworth
St Luke's Church, Goostrey
St Philip's Church, Hassall Green
St Luke's Church, Holmes Chapel
St Michael's Church, Hulme Walfield
St Luke's Church, Oakhanger
All Saints Church, Odd Rode
St Mary's Church, Sandbach
St John the Evangelist's Church, Sandbach Heath
St John the Baptist's Church, Smallwood
St Leonard's Church, Warmingham
Christ Church, Wheelock
St Peter's Church, Swettenham

Knutsford Deanery

St Philip's Church, Alderley Edge
St Catherine's Church, Birtles
Holy Trinity Church, Bollington
St John the Evangelist's Church, Chelford
St John's Church, High Legh
St Mary's Chapel, High Legh
St Cross Church, Knutsford
St John the Baptist's Church, Knutsford
St John's Church, Lindow
St Oswald's Church, Lower Peover
All Saints Church, Marthall
St Wilfrid's Church, Mobberley
St Mary's Church, Nether Alderley
St Lawrence's Church, Over Peover
St Paul's Church, Over Tabley
St Mary's Church, Rostherne
St Peter's Church, Tabley
St John the Evangelist's Church, Toft
St Bartholomew's Church, Wilmslow
Christ Church, Woodford

Macclesfield Deanery

St John the Baptist's Church, Bollington
St Oswald's Church, Bollington
Church of St Mary the Virgin, Bosley
Holy Trinity Chapel, Capesthorne
Forest Chapel
St James' Church, Gawsworth
St Thomas' Church, Henbury
Holy Trinity, Hurdsfield
All Saints Church, Macclesfield
Holy Trinity Church, Macclesfield
St Barnabas, Church, Macclesfield
St John the Evangelist's Church, Macclesfield
St Michael's Church, Macclesfield
St Paul's Church, Macclesfield
St Peter's Church, Macclesfield
St James' and St Paul's Church, Marton
St Michael's Church, North Rode
St Christopher's Church, Pott Shrigley
St Peter's Church, Prestbury
Holy Trinity Church, Rainow
St John the Baptist's Church, Saltersford
All Saints Church, Siddington
St James' Church, Sutton
Church of the Resurrection, Upton Priory
St Saviour's Church, Wildboarclough
St Michael's Church, Wincle

Nantwich Deanery

St Mary's Church, Acton
St James' Church, Audlem
St Michael's Church, Baddiley
St Mary's and St Michael's Church, Burleydam
St Bartholomew's Church, Church Minshull
St Michael's Church, Coppenhall
All Saints Church, Crewe
Christ Church, Crewe
St Andrew's Church, Crewe
St Barnabas' Church, Crewe
St John the Baptist's Church, Crewe
St Paul's Church, Crewe
St Peter's Church, Crewe
St Michael and All Angels Church, Crewe Green
St John's Church, Doddington
St Matthew's Church, Haslington
St Peter's Church, Leighton-cum-Minshull Vernon
St Mary's Church, Nantwich
All Saints Church, Weston
St David's Church, Wettenhall
Church of St Mary the Virgin, Wistaston
St Oswald's Church, Worleston
St Margaret's Church, Wrenbury
St Chad's Church, Wybunbury

Diocese of Liverpool

Archdeaconry of Warrington

Warrington Deanery

Holy Trinity Church, Warrington
St Ann's Church, Warrington
St Barnabas' Church, Warrington
St Elphin's Church, Warrington
St Andrew's Church, Orford, Warrington
St Margaret and All Hallows Church, Orford, Warrington
St Mark's Church, Dallam, Warrington
Christ Church, Padgate, Warrington
Church of the Ascension, Woolston, Warrington
Church of the Transfiguration, Birchwood, Warrington
Church of the Resurrection and St Bridget's, Cinnamon Brow, Warrington (shared with Roman Catholics)
St Philip's Church, Westbrook, Warrington
St James' Church, Westbrook, Warrington
St Paul's Church, Penketh, Warrington
St Mary's Church, Great Sankey, Warrington

Widnes Deanery

St Mary's Church, Hale
St Michael with St Thomas Church
St Ambrose's Church, Widnes
St Basil and All Saints Church, Hough Green, Widnes (shared with Roman Catholics)
St John's Church, Widnes
St Luke's Church, Farnworth, Widnes
St Mary's Church, Widnes
St Paul's Church, Widnes

Winwick Deanery

St Michael's Church, Burtonwood, Warrington
Christ Church, Croft with Southworth, Warrington
All Saints Church, Glazebury, Warrington
Newchurch Parish Church, Culcheth, Warrington
St Oswald's Church, Winwick, Warrington
St Helen's Church, Hollinfare, Warrington

Roman Catholic

The Roman Catholic churches in Cheshire are part of either the diocese of Shrewsbury or the archdiocese of Liverpool.  The Cheshire churches in the archdiocese of Liverpool are in the pastoral areas of Warrington and Widnes.

Diocese of Shrewsbury

St Pius X Church, Alderley Edge
St Gabriel's Church, Alsager
St Monica's Church, Appleton
Our Lady of Fatima's Church, Barnton
St Gregory's Church, Bollington
St Francis' Church, Chester
St Clare's Church, Chester
St Columba's Church, Chester
St Theresa's Church, Chester
St Werburgh's Church, Chester
St Mary's Church, Congleton
St Mary's Church, Crewe
Church of Our Lady of the Sea, Ellesmere Port
St Bernard's Church, Ellesmere Port
St Luke's Church, Frodsham
St Saviour's Church, Great Sutton
St Benedict's Church, Handforth
St Margaret's Church, Holmes Chapel
St Mary of the Angels Church, Hooton
St Vincent de Paul's Church, Knutsford
Our Lady and St Augustine's Church, Latchford
St Winefride's Church, Lymm
St Alban's Church, Macclesfield
St Edward the Confessor's Church, Macclesfield
St Joseph's Church, Malpas
St Mary's Church, Middlewich
St Cuthbert's Church, Mouldsworth
St Anne's Church, Nantwich
St Winefride's Church, Neston
St Wilfrid's Church, Northwich
St Paul's Church, Poynton
Holy Spirit Church, Runcorn
Our Lady's Church, Runcorn
St Augustine's Church, Runcorn
St Edward's Church, Runcorn
St Martin de Porres' Church, Runcorn
St Winefride's Church, Sandbach
St Thomas Becket's Church, Tarporley
St Plegmund's Church, Tattenhall
St Bede's Church, Weaverham
Sacred Heart and St Teresa's Church, Wilmslow
St Joseph's Church, Winsford

Archdiocese of Liverpool

Warrington Pastoral Area

St Paul of the Cross Church, Burtonwood
St Stephen's Church, Orford
St Joseph's Church, Penketh
Sacred Heart Church, Warrington
St Alban's Church, Warrington
Church of the Resurrection and St Bridget's Church, Cinnamon Brow
St Anselm's Chapel, Warrington
St Benedict's Church, Warrington
St Mary's Church, Warrington
St Oswald's Church, Warrington
St Peter and St Michael's Church, Woolston

Widnes Pastoral Area

Holy Family Church, Cronton
Our Lady of Perpetual Succour, Hough Green, Widnes
St Basil and All Saints Church, Widnes
St Bede's Church, Widnes
St John Fisher's Church, Widnes
St Michael's Church, Ditton, Widnes
St Pius X Church, Widnes
St Raphael the Archangel's Church, Widnes

Methodist

The Methodist churches are part of the Chester and Stoke-on-Trent District, the Manchester and Stockport District or the Liverpool District.  Each district is divided into circuits.

Chester and Stoke-on-Trent District

Chester Circuit

Bretton
Caldy Valley Neighbourhood Church
Christleton
Garden Lane, Guilden Sutton (closed 2013)
Hamilton Street, Hoole
Huxley
Mickle Trafford
Rowton
Saltney
Saughall
Tarvin Road, Boughton
Wesley

Congleton Circuit

Bosley
Brookhouse Green
Cloud
Congleton Edge
Davenport
Key Green
Lower Withington
Rood Lane
Trinity
Wellspring

Crewe Circuit

Bradfield Rd
Hough
North Street
St.Mark's
St.John's
St.Stephen's
Wells Green.

Delamere Forest Circuit

Bunbury with Tiverton
Frodsham
Helsby
Kelsall
Kingsley, Blakelees
Kingsley, The Hurst
Norley
Oakmere with Ashton
Tarporley
Tarvin

Middlewich Circuit

Bradshaw Brook
Goostrey
Holmes Chapel
Middlewich

Nantwich Circuit

Audlem
Baddiley and Ravensmoor
Barbridge
Betley
Broomhall and Sound
Broad Lane
Chorlton
Hankelow
Hatherton
Nantwich
Poole
Willaston
Woore

Northwich Circuit

Acton Bridge
Barnton
Bartington
Castle, Comberbach
Cuddington
Davenham
Hartford
Lostock Green
Northwich
Moulton
Pickmere
Plumley
Sandiway
Shurlach
Weaverham

Runcorn Circuit

Beechwood West
Bethesda
Hallwood Parish
Halton, Trinity
Murdishaw Church (Norton Parish)
Preston-on-the-Hill
St Mark's
St.Paul's
The Heath
Wicksten Drive

Sandbach and Alsager Circuit

Alsager, Hassall Road
Alsager, Wesley Place
Bradwall
Elworth, The Avenue
Elworth, Mount Pleasant
Ettiley Heath,  Haslington
Oakhanger
Rode Heath
Sandbach
Sandbach Heath
Wheelock
Winterley

Winsford Circuit

Chester Road
Clive Green
Little Budworth
St.Andrew's
Trinity
Weaver
Whitegate

Liverpool District

South Wirral Circuit

Trinity, Ellesmere Port
Elton
Zion, Little Neston
Little Sutton
Neston
Whitby
Willaston

Warrington Circuit

Antrobus
Hood Manor
Latchford
Lymm
Padgate
Penketh
Rixton
Stockton Heath
St Philip's, Westbrook
St Martin's, Woolston

Widnes Circuit

Cronton
Farnworth
Halebank
Hough Green
Trinity, Widnes

United Reformed

United Reformed churches in Cheshire include the following.

Thomas Risley, Birchwood
Blacon
Bollington
Sealand Road, Chester
Vicars Cross, Chester
Congleton
The Rock Chapel, Farndon
Caldy Valley, Great Boughton
Handbridge
Haslington and Crewe
Hoole
Lymm
Macclesfield
High Street, Malpas
Middlewich
Minshull
Nantwich
Winsford
Northwich
Parkgate and Neston
Beechwood West, Runcorn
Bethesda, Runcorn
St Mark's Runcorn
Upton-by-Chester
Elmwood Avenue, Warrington
St John's Warrington
Wycliffe, Warrington
Trinity, Widnes
Wilmslow
Over, Wilmslow

Baptist

Cheshire churches in the Baptist Union include the following.

Milton, Acton Bridge
Audlem Baptist Church
Hoole, Chester
Crewe, Union Street Baptist Church
Disley
Little Leigh
Lymm
Bethel, Macclesfield
Macclesfield
Nantwich
Poynton
Sandbach
Tarporley
Arpley Street, Warrington
Hill Cliffe, Warrington
Latchford, Warrington
Widnes

Other active churches

Church of God

New Testament Church of God, Crewe

Elim Pentecostal

Elim Pentecostal Churches in Cheshire.

Elim Pentecostal Church, Chester
Crewe New Life Community Church
West Street Church, Crewe
Elim Christian Life Centre, Macclesfield
Elim Pentecostal Church, Nantwich
King's Church, Warrington
Farnworth Christian Fellowship, Widnes

Assemblies of God

Assemblies of God churches include:

!Audacious Church
Alsager Community Church
Christian Life Church, Bollington
Queen Street Christian Centre, Chester
Oasis Christian Centre, Ellesmere Port
The Foundry, Golborne Campus
Calvary Christian Centre, Macclesfield
Middlewich Community Church
Barnton Pentecostal Church, Northwich
Poynton Christian Fellowship
Hope Corner Community Church, Runcorn
Bethany Pentecostal Church, Warrington
Assembly of God, Wilmslow
Life Church, Warrington
Life Church, Lymm
The Foundry, Widnes Campus
The Foundry, Dallam Campus

Winsford Churches Together

Winsford Churches Together is a Group of all Churches in the Winsford area.

River of Life Church, Winsford
Christ Church Wharton, Winsford
Living Waters Christian Ministries, Dingle Centre and Queen's Parade, Winsford
Over United Reformed Church, Winsford
The Storehouse Church, Winsford
Over, St Chad's Church, Winsford
The Salvation Army, Winsford
St John's Church Over, Winsford
St Joseph's Catholic Church, Winsford
St Andrews Methodist Church, Winsford

Unclassified

Other churches identified in the UK Church Directory include the following.

English Presbyterian Church of Wales, Chester
Pentecostal Holiness Church "Continuing" Upton, Chester
Upton Baptist Church (Independent), Upton, Chester
Main Street Community Church, Frodsham
Good News Church, Macclesfield
Macclesfield Family Church
Neston Christian Fellowship
Bethesda Evangelical Church, Stockton Heath
Stockton Heath Christian Fellowship
The Storehouse Church Cheshire, Tarporley
Tytherington Family Worship Church
Hebron Church, Warrington
CrossRoads Community Church in South Cheshire

Kingsway Chapel, Newton, Chester

Redundant churches

Holy Trinity Church, Chester (Guildhall)
Church of St Mary-on-the-Hill, Chester (educational centre)
St Michael's Church, Chester (heritage centre)
St Nicholas' Chapel, Chester (shop)
All Saints Church, Harthill (community centre)
Christ Church, Macclesfield (redundant)
Congregational Chapel, Nantwich (residential)
Primitive Methodist Chapel, Nantwich (part residential, part unused)
Wesleyan Methodist Church, Nantwich (unused)
Christ Church, Weston Point, Runcorn (unused)
Mariners' Mission, Runcorn (industrial use)
Welsh Chapel, Runcorn (unused)
Warburton Old Church
St Ann's (old) Church, Warrington (indoor climbing centre)
St Marie's Church, Widnes (unused)
St Chad's Church, Wybunbury (only tower still stands)

References

Cheshire
Churches in Cheshire
Churches